Ship money  was a tax of medieval origin levied intermittently in the Kingdom of England until the middle of the 17th century. Assessed typically on the inhabitants of coastal areas of England, it was one of several taxes that English monarchs could levy by prerogative without the approval of Parliament. The attempt of King Charles I from 1634 onwards to levy ship money during peacetime and extend it to the inland counties of England without parliamentary approval provoked fierce resistance, and was one of the grievances of the English propertied class in the lead-up to the English Civil War.

Traditional practice

The Plantagenet kings of England had exercised the right of requiring the maritime towns and counties to furnish ships in time of war, and this duty was sometimes commuted for a money payment.

Although several statutes of Edward I and Edward III, notably their confirmations of Magna Carta, had made it illegal for the Crown to exact any taxes without the consent of Parliament, the prerogative of levying ship money in time of war had never fallen wholly into abeyance. In 1619 James I aroused no popular opposition by levying £40,000 of ship money on London and £8,550 on other seaport towns.

Opposition

In 1628, Charles I, having prorogued Parliament in early summer and after his assent to the Petition of Right, proceeded to levy ship money on every county in England without Parliament, issuing writs requiring £173,000 to be returned to the exchequer.  This was the first occasion when the demand for ship-money aroused serious opposition, in view of the declaration in the petition that

[Y]our subjects have inherited this freedom, that they should not be compelled to contribute to any tax, tallage, aid, or other like charge not set by common consent, in parliament.

Charles' requests to sheriffs were rejected by the overburdened inland populations; Lord Northampton, Lord-Lieutenant of Warwickshire, and the Earl of Banbury in Berkshire, refused to assist in collecting the money; and Charles withdrew the writs.

In 1634, Charles made a secret treaty with Philip IV of Spain to assist him against the Dutch.  To raise funds for this assistance William Noy, the Attorney-General, suggested that a further resort should be had to ship money. Noy set himself to investigate such ancient legal learning as was in existence in support of the demand, and unearthed old records of ship money in the Tower of London; some historians, such as Hallam, have seen Noy's investigations as evidence that before Charles' levying of ship money the tax had been disused and forgotten for centuries.

The King obtained an opinion in favour of the legality of the writ from Lord Keeper Coventry and the Earl of Manchester, whereupon the writ was issued in October 1634 and directed to the justices of London and other seaports, requiring them to provide a certain number of ships of war of a prescribed tonnage and equipment, or their equivalent in money, and empowering them to assess the inhabitants for payment of the tax according to their substance.

Three writs 
The distinctive feature of the writ of 1634 was that it was issued, contrary to all precedent, in time of peace. Charles desired to conceal the true aim of his policy, which he knew would be detested by the country, and he accordingly alleged as a pretext for the impost the danger to commerce from pirates, and the general condition of unrest in Europe.

The citizens of London immediately claimed exemption under their charter, while other towns argued as to the amount of their assessment; but no resistance on constitutional grounds appears to have been offered to the validity of the writ, and a sum of £104,000 was collected.

On October 9, 1635, a second writ of ship tax was issued, directed on this occasion, as in the revoked writ of 1628, to the sheriffs and justices of inland as well as of maritime counties and towns, demanding the sum of £208,000 which was to be obtained by assessment on personal as well as real property, payment to be enforced by distraint.

This demand excited growing popular discontent, which now began to see in it a determination on the part of the king to dispense altogether with parliamentary government. Charles, therefore, obtained a written opinion, signed by ten out of twelve judges consulted, to the effect that in time of national danger, of which the Crown was the sole judge, ship money might legally be levied on all parts of the country by writ under the Great Seal.

The issue of a third writ of ship money on 9 October 1636 made it evident that the ancient restrictions that limited the levying of the tax to the maritime parts of the kingdom and to times of war (or imminent national danger) had been finally swept away, and that the king intended to convert it into a permanent and general form of taxation without parliamentary sanction. The judges again, at Charles's request, gave an opinion favourable to the prerogative, which was read by Lord Coventry in the Star Chamber and by the judges on assize.

Refusal, then repeal

Ship money was enough of a financial success to help Charles to meet peacetime government expenditures in the 1630s. Payment was, however, refused by John Hampden, a wealthy Buckinghamshire gentleman landowner. The case against the latter (R v Hampden) was finally heard before all 12 judges in the Court of Exchequer Chamber in 1637, after Denham had expressed his doubts to Davenport, who was wary of the four judge panel which would have sat in a less unusual case. Hampden was defended by Oliver St John and Robert Holborne. The Solicitor-General, Sir Edward Littleton, and the Attorney-General, Sir John Banks, prosecuted. Hampden's lawyers argued that the taxation was the king going around Parliament and attempting to squeeze money out from the people of England while defenders of the king suggested that these taxes were necessary for the defense and safety of England.Hampden lost the case, seven judges to five:

 For the King:
 Sir Richard Weston
 Sir Francis Crawley
 Sir Robert Berkley
 Sir George Vernon
 Sir Thomas Trevor
 Sir William Jones
 Sir John Finch
 For Hampden:
 Sir George Crooke
 Sir Richard Hutton
 Sir John Denham
 Sir John Brampston
 Sir Humphrey Davenport

Aftermath 
Despite the trial case being won by Charles the opposition to ship money continued. In 1640 a group of citizens of London petitioned Charles directly and at the top of their grievances was against the tax:The petition starts off by attacking the tax: The pressing and unusual Impositions upon Merchandize, Importing and Exporting, and the urging and Levying of Ship-money, notwithstanding both which, Merchants Ships and Goods have been taken and destroyed both by Turkish and other Pirates.The narrowness of the case encouraged others to refuse the tax, and by 1639, less than 20% of the money demanded was raised.  As matters deteriorated in England and Scotland starting with the Bishops' War, ship money would prove insufficient to finance the king's military needs.  It would later be stopped by the Long Parliament when they voted the Ship Money Act 1640. Hampden went on to Parliamentary and Civil War leadership, only to die early on at the Battle of Chalgrove Field. Finally, half a century later, in the aftermath of the Glorious Revolution, the Bill of Rights 1689 prohibited all forms of extra-Parliamentary taxation.

References

Further reading
 Gordon, M. D. "The Collection of Ship-money in the Reign of Charles I." Transactions of the Royal Historical Society 4 (1910): 141–162. online
 Keir, D.L. "The Case of the Ship-Money". Law Quarterly Review 52, (1936) p. 546.
 Langelüddecke, Henrik. "'I finde all men & my officers all soe unwilling' The Collection of Ship Money, 1635–1640." Journal of British Studies 46.3 (2007): 509–542. online
 Mendle, Michael. "The Ship Money Case, The Case of Shipmony, and the Development of Henry Parker's Parliamentary Absolutism". The Historical Journal, Vol. 32, No. 3 (Sept. 1989), pp. 513–536.

Economy of Stuart England
English Civil War
History of taxation in the United Kingdom
Monarchy and money